William Edward Thrift (28 February 1870 – 23 April 1942) was an Irish university professor, an independent Unionist member of the House of Commons of Southern Ireland and an independent Teachta Dála (TD).

He was born in England, grew up in Carlow, and was educated at The High School, Dublin and at Trinity College Dublin (TCD) (BA 1893, MA 1896, Fellow 1896). He served as Erasmus Smith's Professor of Natural and Experimental Philosophy at Trinity College Dublin from 1901 to 1929. He was awarded DSc in 1936. He was appointed Provost of Trinity College Dublin in 1937, serving until his death in 1942.

He was also active in politics. He was elected to the House of Commons of Southern Ireland at the 1921 elections, representing the Dublin University constituency. As an independent Unionist, he did not participate in the Second Dáil. He was re-elected for the same constituency at the 1922 general election and became a member of the Third Dáil. He was re-elected at the next five general elections until 1937 when he retired from politics.

References

External links
 

1870 births
1942 deaths
Alumni of Trinity College Dublin
Fellows of Trinity College Dublin
Independent TDs
Members of the 2nd Dáil
Members of the 3rd Dáil
Members of the 4th Dáil
Members of the 5th Dáil
Members of the 6th Dáil
Members of the 7th Dáil
Members of the 8th Dáil
People educated at The High School, Dublin
People from Halifax, West Yorkshire
People of the Irish Civil War (Pro-Treaty side)
Provosts of Trinity College Dublin
Teachtaí Dála for Dublin University